Stuart Miles (born 20 February 1969) is a British radio and television presenter, who has worked on the children's programme Blue Peter.

Career 
Miles studied at Bournemouth University where he developed an interest in college radio, followed by a stint on hospital radio.

Stuart Miles gained his TV break working as a journalist for a local Cable TV station covering news and events in South London. From 1993 to 1994, Miles presented Saturday Disney, which led to him joining Blue Peter on 27 June 1994; some of his most memorable moments included joining the RAF Falcons display team and starring in various Blue Peter pantomimes. His last appearance was on 21 June 1999.

Miles controversially decided to leave Blue Peter after declaring that it was 'out of touch' with the then-current generation of children and needed to be modernized, and was frustrated at not being selected for its newly-vacant job of Programme Editor; he also felt that the sacking of co-presenter Richard Bacon had not been handled well. Stuart presented with Diane-Louise Jordan, Tim Vincent, Katy Hill, Romana D'Annunzio, Richard Bacon, Konnie Huq and Simon Thomas.

Since leaving Blue Peter, Miles has guest-presented such programmes as This Morning, Holiday, and Soap Fever, and took part in When Blue Peter Became ABBA. He has also directed various programmes, and regularly appears in pantomime.

In 2007, Stuart presented on Sky Vegas, an interactive gambling television channel, and started regularly performing his drag act, as a character called Stella Ratner.

In January 2008, Stuart joined Gaydar Radio, replacing Sam Vangeen in its lunchtime Your Choice Requests show.

In 2008, Stuart took his live drag stand-up comedy show, "The Adventures of Pink Peter", to the Edinburgh Fringe festival.

On 26 April 2010, it was announced that Stuart would be the new Heart 96.6 (Northants) breakfast presenter, along with Natalie Besbrode (Natalie B), starting on 4 May, followed by the reformed Heart Home Counties which started on 16 July. Between February 2015 and July 2017 he co-presented "Heart Breakfast" with his former Blue Peter colleague Katy Hill.

He is also the regular stand in for Andy Collins on the breakfast show on BBC Three Counties Radio.

Credits

Footnotes

External links 
 

1969 births
Living people
Alumni of Bournemouth University
Blue Peter presenters
British television presenters
GMTV presenters and reporters
British LGBT broadcasters
Gay comedians
English LGBT entertainers
People educated at Maidstone Grammar School
British LGBT comedians